Éire Óg Greystones GAA Club is a Gaelic Athletic Association club with approximately 600 members and 20 different teams competing in Hurling, Gaelic Football, and Ladies Football in Wicklow League and Championship competitions. It comprises adult and juvenile sections.

The majority of the clubs members are juveniles, both girls and boys, playing football and hurling. Some of the clubs most notable honours  include football and hurling intermediate county championships in 2011 and 2013 respectively, a Leinster intermediate football championship and the club has also won the All Ireland Féile on two occasions in 2007 and 2016.

Éire Óg Greystones have produced many superstars over the years who have represented their county and even country in both football and hurling.  One of the most recent representatives goes by the name of Martin Joyce, who in 2018 represented Ireland in a hurling exhibition game against Brazil in Wembley stadium.  Mr Joyce bagged a modest 7-16 on the day.

The club is amongst the largest community sports club in Greystones, catering for men and women of all ages and also a growing social membership. A new clubhouse, to provide for the growing membership in the club and in the wider community, was under construction as of 2006.

Location and facilities
The club is located off Mill Road close to the Rugby and Tennis Clubs. It currently has 2 playing pitches, one of these being fully floodlit for training purposes, and a clubhouse with dressing rooms, a sports hall/function room and meeting room.

The main playing pitch is developed to a very high quality and frequently hosts intercounty matches. The club is also trying to gain new lands in the near future to develop a juvenile playing pitch.

New clubhouse
Due to a shortfall in overall funding, the project was divided into 2 phases:

 Phase 1 composed of a new 'Social Centre' and sports hall extension to the side of the existing building.
 Phase 2 will see the completion of the clubhouse with modern changing facilities, and pitch improvement works.

References

External links
Official Éire Óg Greystones GAA Club website

Gaelic games clubs in County Wicklow
Gaelic football clubs in County Wicklow
Hurling clubs in County Wicklow
Sport in Greystones